Lahcen is a surname. Notable people with the surname include:

Mohamed Lahcen (born 1931), Moroccan middle-distance runner
Raouf Lahcen (born 1981), Algerian footballer

See also
Lahcen (given name)